The black-capped tinamou (Crypturellus atrocapillus) is a type of tinamou commonly found in the moist forest lowlands in subtropical and tropical regions.

Taxonomy
All tinamou are from the family Tinamidae, and in the larger scheme are also ratites.  Unlike other ratites, tinamous can fly, although in general, they are not strong fliers. All ratites evolved from prehistoric flying birds, and tinamous are the closest living relative of these birds.

The black-capped tinamou has two subspecies as follows:
 C. a. atrocapillus, nominate race, occurs in the lowlands of southeastern Peru.
 C. a. garleppi in the lowlands of northern Bolivia.

Etymology
Crypturellus is formed from three Latin or Greek words.  kruptos meaning "covered" or "hidden", oura meaning "tail", and ellus meaning "diminutive".  Therefore, Crypturellus means small hidden tail.

Description
Its upper-parts are brown, mottled and barred blackish, throat and neck are rufescent, breast is dark grey, and the remainder of underparts are cinnamon to buff. Its cap is blackish and legs could be pale red or bright red. The females are more heavily barred above.

Behavior
Like other tinamous, the black-capped eats fruit off the ground or low-lying bushes. They also eat small amounts of invertebrates, flower buds, tender leaves, seeds, and roots. The male incubates the eggs which may come from as many as 4 different females, and then will raise them until they are ready to be on their own, usually 2–3 weeks. The nest is located on the ground in dense brush or between raised root buttresses.

Range and habitat
It is found in moist forest lowlands in subtropical and tropical regions up to  altitude. This species is native to southeastern Peru and northern Bolivia. Has recently been recorded in Brazil.

Conservation
It is rated as least concern status by the IUCN

Footnotes

References
 BirdLife Species Factsheet
 
 
 
 

Crypturellus
Tinamous of South America
Birds of Bolivia
Birds of Brazil
Birds of Peru
Birds described in 1844